Gharbeh (also known as Gharbeh-ye Pā’īn) is a village in Jam Rural District, in the Central District of Jam County, Bushehr Province, Iran. At the 2006 census, its population was 42, in 8 families.

References 

Populated places in Jam County